The commander of the People's Liberation Army Navy is the commanding officer of the People's Liberation Army Navy (PLAN). The current commander is Admiral Dong Jun.

History
The Navy of the People's Liberation Army Navy East China Military Area Command was originally established on April 23, 1949, in Baimamiao Township of Tai County, Jiangsu province, General Zhang Aiping was commissioned as commander and political commissar.

On April 14, 1950, the People's Liberation Army Navy Navy Command was established in Beijing, which is the China's highest naval organ. The Commander of the People's Liberation Army Navy Navy is nominated by the President for appointment from any eligible officers holding the rank of admiral or vice-admiral (shang jiang), and under the leadership of the Central Military Commission. Grand Admiral Xiao Jinguang was the first commander of the People's Liberation Army Navy Navy.

List of commanders

Commander of the People's Liberation Army Navy East China Military Area Command Navy

Commander of the People's Liberation Army Navy Navy

References

Further reading